Amblytelus marginicollis is a species of ground beetle in the subfamily Psydrinae. It was described by Sloane in 1911.

References

Amblytelus
Beetles described in 1911